Crnogorsko oro (Montenegrin and Serbian: crnogorsko oro / црногорско оро), or simply oro is a Montenegrin national folk dance originating in the Dinaric region of the Western Balkans.

Etymology

The name 'oro' derives from the dialectal form of the word 'Orao', meaning 'Eagle', referring to how the dance is performed to resemble the movements of an eagle.

Popularity
Oro is typically performed at Montenegrin and Herzegovinian weddings and celebrations. It may be included in stylized folklore choreography, and is performed by folk dance groups from Montenegro and Serbia at competitions worldwide .

Video 
 Oro sample — folk dance Oro by ensemble “Budo Tomovic” (Montenegro).

References

Montenegrin dances
Montenegrin music
Montenegrin culture
Serbian dances
Serbian music
Serbian culture